Guioa plurinervis is a species of plant in the family Sapindaceae. It is endemic to Papua New Guinea.

References

plurinervis
Endemic flora of Papua New Guinea
Vulnerable plants
Taxonomy articles created by Polbot